Bryce Martin Jarvis (born December 26, 1997) is an American professional baseball pitcher in the Arizona Diamondbacks organization. Jarvis was selected 18th overall by the Diamondbacks in the 2020 Major League Baseball draft.

Amateur career
Jarvis attended Brentwood Academy in Brentwood, Tennessee. As a junior in 2016, he pitched to a 5–0 record with a 2.33 ERA alongside batting .346, earning all-state honors. In 2017, as a senior, he once again was awarded all-state honors alongside being named the 2017 Tennessee Baseball Player of the Year. He went undrafted in the 2017 Major League Baseball draft and thus enrolled at Duke University where he played college baseball for the Duke Blue Devils.

As a freshman at Duke in 2018, Jarvis appeared in 25 games (five starts) in which he went 5–1 with a 2.45 ERA, striking out 67 batters over  innings. That summer, he played in the Cape Cod Baseball League for the Cotuit Kettleers. In 2019, his sophomore season, he went 5–2 with a 3.81 ERA over 19 games (11 starts) with 94 strikeouts over  innings. He was named the Most Valuable Player of the National Collegiate Athletic Association Morgantown Regional. He was selected by the New York Yankees in the 37th round of the 2019 Major League Baseball draft, but did not sign. As a junior in 2020, Jarvis threw the first perfect game in Duke history on February 21 against Cornell, striking out 15 batters in an 8–0 win. He compiled a 3–1 record with a 0.67 ERA over four starts, striking out forty over 27 innings, before the college baseball season was cut short due to the COVID-19 pandemic.

Professional career
Jarvis was selected 18th overall by the Arizona Diamondbacks in the 2020 Major League Baseball draft. He signed with the Diamondbacks on June 25 for a bonus of $2.65 million. He did not play a minor league game in 2020 due to the cancellation of the minor league season caused by the pandemic.

To begin the 2021 season, Jarvis was assigned to the Hillsboro Hops of the High-A West to make his professional debut. After pitching  innings and going 1-2 with a 3.62 ERA and 42 strikeouts over seven starts, he was promoted to the Amarillo Sod Poodles of the Double-A Central on June 21. With Amarillo, he missed over a month due to an oblique injury. Over eight starts with Amarillo, Jarvis went 1-2 with a 5.66 ERA and forty strikeouts over 35 innings. He returned to Amarillo for the 2022 season. Over 25 starts, Jarvis went 3-6 with an 8.27 ERA, sixty walks, and 110 strikeouts over  innings.

Personal
Jarvis was born to Kevin and Elizabeth Jarvis, and also has a younger sister named Kennedy. His father was a pitcher who played collegiately at Wake Forest and played 13 years in Major League Baseball.

References

External links

Duke Blue Devils bio

1997 births
Living people
Baseball players from Tennessee
Baseball pitchers
Duke Blue Devils baseball players
Cotuit Kettleers players
Hillsboro Hops players
Amarillo Sod Poodles players